Orpiella is a genus of air-breathing land snails, terrestrial pulmonate gastropod mollusks in the family Trochomorphidae.

Species
Species within the genus Orpiella include:
 Orpiella artensis (Souverbie, 1859)
 Orpiella compluviata (Cox, 1871)
 Orpiella concava (Clapp, 1923)
 Orpiella cookensis (Gude, 1905)
 Orpiella desmazuresi (Crosse, 1872)
 Orpiella fragillima (Mousson, 1870)
 Orpiella keppelli (L. Pfeiffer, 1855)
 Orpiella kuntzi Solem, 1960
 Orpiella lepida (Gude, 1913)
 Orpiella malaitaensis (Clapp, 1923)
 Orpiella manni (Clapp, 1923)
 Orpiella pamuaensis (Clapp, 1923)
 Orpiella proxima H. B. Baker, 1941
 Orpiella retardata (Cox, 1870)
 Orpiella salomonis (Vanatta, 1930)
 Orpiella schmeltziana (Garrett, 1887)
 Orpiella scorpio (Gould, 1846)
 Orpiella smithi (Clapp, 1923)
 Orpiella solidiuscula (E. A. Smith, 1885)
 Orpiella sororum (Clapp, 1923)
 Orpiella tenella (Garrett, 1872)
 Orpiella treasuryensis (Tryon, 1886)
 Orpiella woodwardi (Godwin-Austen, 1903)
Species brought into synonymy
 Orpiella casca (Gould, 1852): synonym of Orpiella scorpio (Gould, 1846) (junior synonym)
 Orpiella godeffroyana (Garrett, 1872): synonym of Irenella godeffroyana (Garrett, 1872) (superseded combination)
 Orpiella hoyti (Garrett, 1872): synonym of Irenella hoyti (Garrett, 1872) (superseded combination)
 Orpiella macgillivrayi (Gude, 1913): synonym of Fijia macgillivrayi Gude, 1913 (superseded combination)
 Orpiella nitidissima (E. A. Smith, 1885): synonym of Orpiella treasuryensis (Tryon, 1886) (junior secondary homonym replaced before 1961)
 Orpiella nouleti (Le Guillou, 1842): synonym of Irenella nouleti (Le Guillou, 1842) (superseded combination)
 Orpiella otarae (Garrett, 1872): synonym of Irenella otarae (Garrett, 1872) (superseded combination)
 Orpiella pfeifferi (Philippi, 1845): synonym of Irenella pfeifferi (Philippi, 1845) (superseded combination)
 Orpiella placita (Gude, 1913): synonym of Eufretum placita (Gude, 1913) (superseded combination)
 Orpiella plicostriata (Mousson, 1870): synonym of Fijia plicostriata (Mousson, 1870) (superseded combination)
 Orpiella ramsayi (Liardet, 1876): synonym of Eufretum ramsayi (Liardet, 1876) (superseded combination)
 Orpiella sorora [sic]: synonym of Orpiella sororum (Clapp, 1923) (misspelling)

References

Vol. III. Trochomorphidae and systematical review of all other families. Ancona: L'Informatore Piceno. 160 pp

External links

 Gray, J.E. ("descriptions of the species" by L. Pfeiffer). (1855). Catalogue of Pulmonata or air-breathing Mollusca in the collection of the British Museum, Part I. London: Taylor & Francis. 192 pp
 Baker, H. B. (1941). Zonitid snails from Pacific islands. Part 3 and 4. Bernice P. Bishop Museum Bulletin. 166: 203–370
 Sykes, E. R. (1900). Notes on the non-marine Mollusca of Norfolk and Phillip Islands, with descriptions of new species. Proceedings of the Malacological Society of London. 4: 139-147
 Semper, C. (1870-1885). Reisen im Archipel der Philippinen, Theil 2. Wissenschaftliche Resultate. Band 3, Landmollusken. Wiesbaden: Kreidel
  Gude, G. K. (1911). Note on some preoccupied generic names and proposed new genera of the family Zonitidae. Proceedings of the Malacological Society of London. 9(4): 269-273.

Trochomorphidae